Matthias (Koine Greek: Μαθθίας, Maththías , from Hebrew מַתִּתְיָהוּ Mattiṯyāhū; ; died c. AD 80) was, according to the Acts of the Apostles (written c. AD 63), chosen by the apostles to replace Judas Iscariot following the latter's betrayal of Jesus and his subsequent death. His calling as an apostle is unique, in that his appointment was not made personally by Jesus, who had already ascended into heaven, and it was also made before the descent of the Holy Spirit upon the early Church.

Biography
There is no mention of a Matthias among the lists of disciples or followers of Jesus in the three synoptic gospels, but according to Acts, he had been with Jesus from his baptism by John until his Ascension. In the days following, Peter proposed that the assembled disciples, who numbered about 120, nominate two men to replace Judas. They chose Joseph called Barsabas (whose surname was Justus) and Matthias. Then they prayed, "Thou, Lord, which knowest the hearts of all [men], shew whether of these two thou hast chosen, That he may take part of this ministry and apostleship, from which Judas by transgression fell, that he might go to his own place." Then they cast lots, and the lot fell to Matthias; so he was numbered with the eleven apostles.

No further information about Matthias is to be found in the canonical New Testament. Even his name is variable: the Syriac version of Eusebius calls him throughout not Matthias but "Tolmai", not to be confused with Bartholomew (which means Son of Tolmai), who was one of the twelve original Apostles; Clement of Alexandria refers once to Zacchaeus in a way which could be read as suggesting that some identified him with Matthias; the Clementine Recognitions identify him with Barnabas; Adolf Bernhard Christoph Hilgenfeld thinks he is the same as Nathanael in the Gospel of John.

Ministry
The tradition of the Greeks says that St. Matthias planted the faith about Cappadocia and on the coasts of the Caspian Sea, residing chiefly near the port Issus.

According to Nicephorus (Historia eccl., 2, 40), Matthias first preached the Gospel in Judaea, then in Aethiopia (by the region of Colchis, now in modern-day Georgia) and was crucified. An extant Coptic Acts of Andrew and Matthias, places his activity similarly in "the city of the cannibals" in Aethiopia. A marker placed in the ruins of the Roman fortress at Gonio (Apsaros) in the modern Georgian region of Adjara claims that Matthias is buried at that site.

The Synopsis of Dorotheus contains this tradition: "Matthias preached the Gospel to barbarians and meat-eaters in the interior of Ethiopia, where the sea harbor of Hyssus is, at the mouth of the river Phasis. He died at Sebastopolis, and was buried there, near the Temple of the Sun."

Alternatively, another tradition maintains that Matthias was stoned at Jerusalem by the local populace, and then beheaded (cf. Tillemont, Mémoires pour servir à l'histoire ecclesiastique des six premiers siècles, I, 406–7). According to Hippolytus of Rome, Matthias died of old age in Jerusalem.

Clement of Alexandria observed (Stromateis vi.13.):

Not that they became apostles through being chosen for some distinguished peculiarity of nature, since also Judas was chosen along with them. But they were capable of becoming apostles on being chosen by Him who foresees even ultimate issues. Matthias, accordingly, who was not chosen along with them, on showing himself worthy of becoming an apostle, is substituted for Judas.

Writings
Surviving fragments of the lost Gospels of Matthias attribute it to Matthias, but Early Church Fathers attributed it to heretical writings in the 2nd century.

Veneration

The feast of Saint Matthias was included in the Roman Calendar in the 11th century and celebrated on the sixth day to the Calends of March (24 February usually, but 25 February in leap years). In the revision of the General Roman Calendar in 1969, his feast was transferred to 14 May, so as not to celebrate it in Lent but instead in Eastertide close to the Solemnity of the Ascension, the event after which the Acts of the Apostles recounts that Matthias was selected to be ranked with the Twelve Apostles.

The Eastern Rites of the Eastern Orthodox Church celebrate his feast on 9 August. Yet the Western Rite parishes of the Orthodox Church continues the old Roman Rite of 24 and 25 February in leap years.

The Church of England's Book of Common Prayer, as well as other older common prayer books in the Anglican Communion, celebrates Matthias on 24 February. According to the newer Common Worship liturgy, Matthias is remembered in the Church of England with a Festival on 14 May, although he may be celebrated on 24 February, if desired. In the Episcopal Church as well as some in the Lutheran Church, including the Lutheran Church–Missouri Synod and the Lutheran Church–Canada, his feast remains on 24 February. In Evangelical Lutheran Worship, used by the Evangelical Lutheran Church in America as well as the Evangelical Lutheran Church in Canada, the feast date for Matthias is on 14 May.

It is claimed that St Matthias the Apostle's remains were brought to Italy through Empress Helena, mother of Emperor Constantine I (the Great); part of these relics would be interred in the Abbey of Santa Giustina, Padua, and the remaining in the Abbey of St. Matthias, Trier, Germany. According to Greek sources, the remains of the apostle are buried in the castle of Gonio-Apsaros, Georgia.

Notes

See also
 Acta Andreae et Matthiae apud Anthropophagos

Further reading

References

Citations

External links

1st-century births
80 deaths
Saints from the Holy Land
1st-century Christian saints
1st-century Christian martyrs
People in Acts of the Apostles
Christian saints from the New Testament
Burials at St. Matthias' Abbey
Seventy disciples
Twelve Apostles
Anglican saints